Punta Gorda may refer to several places:

 Punta Gorda, Belize
 Punta Gorda, Colonia, Uruguay
 Punta Gorda, Florida
 Punta Gorda Light, Humboldt County, California, USA
 Punta Gorda, Montevideo, in Uruguay
 Punta Gorda Middle School, is a school
 Punta Gorda, Nicaragua, where Hurricane Felix made landfall as a category 5 hurricane in 2007
 The Punta Gorda coastal area in Ventura County, California

See also 
 Punta Gorda Airport (disambiguation)
 Puntagorda, a municipality on Las Palmas Island, Canary Islands